The 1996 Charlotte Rage season was the fifth and final season for the Charlotte Rage. They finished the 1996 Arena Football League season 5–9 and were one of four teams in the National Conference to miss the playoffs.

Schedule

Regular season

Standings

References

Charlotte Rage seasons
1996 Arena Football League season
Charlotte Rage Season, 1996